David Rennie may refer to:

David Rennie (columnist) (born 1971), British columnist
David Rennie (film editor), American film editor
David Rennie (footballer) (born 1964), Scottish footballer
Dave Rennie (born 1963), New Zealand Rugby Union player and coach